Richard J. Lewis is a Canadian television and film director.

From 2002 to 2009, Lewis worked on the CBS television crime drama series  CSI: Crime Scene Investigation as writer, director and co-executive producer.

He is best known for directing the films Whale Music (1994) and Barney's Version (2010), the latter featuring a Golden Globe winning performance by actor Paul Giamatti as well as his work on the HBO series Westworld.

Select filmography as director
 Alfred Hitchcock Presents (1985)
 Superboy (1988)
 Whale Music (1994)
 Jake and the Kid (1995)
 North of 60 (1993–1997)
 Michael Hayes (1997)
 Due South (2 episodes, 1996; 1 episode, 1997)
 Little Men (1 episode, 1999)
 Justice (1999)
 Falcone (1999)
 Traders (1 episode, 2000)
 The District (1 episode, 2000)
 Family Law (3 episodes, 2000–2001)
 The Chris Isaak Show (1 episode, 2001)
 K-9: P.I. (2002) (V)
 Waterfront (1 episode, 2006)
 CSI: Crime Scene Investigation (33 episodes, 2000–2006)
 Barney's Version (2010)
 Person of Interest (2012)
 Westworld (2016–2020)
 Ransom (2017)
 A Million Little Things (2018–2020)
 The Enemy Within (2019)
 Penny Dreadful: City Of Angels (2020)

References

External links
 
 Q&A with Richard J. Lewis about 'Barney's Version' 

Canadian expatriates in the United States
Canadian television directors
Living people
Northwestern University School of Communication alumni
Film directors from Toronto
Writers from Toronto
Canadian male screenwriters
Year of birth missing (living people)
20th-century Canadian screenwriters
20th-century Canadian male writers
21st-century Canadian screenwriters
21st-century Canadian male writers